The 2020–21 Liiga season was the 46th season of the Liiga (formerly SM-liiga), the top level of ice hockey in Finland, since the league's formation in 1975. Due to the COVID-19 pandemic all the games had to be played to a very limited audience or no audience at all. Two teams have temporarily let go of their coaches due to financial reasons: JYP and SaiPa. The season was Hakametsä's last full season.

Teams

Regular season
Top six advanced straight to the quarter-finals, while teams between 7th and 10th positions played a wild card round for the final two spots. The Liiga is a closed series and thus there is no relegation. Due to several games having been cancelled due to COVID-19 cases in various teams in March 2021, not all teams got an even number of games, therefore Liiga decided that the rankings of the regular season will be determined by points per game average.

Rules for classification: 1) Points per game; 2) 3-point wins 3) Goal difference; 4) Goals scored; 5) Head-to-head points.

Playoffs
Contrary to the best of three format used in the past seasons, the wild-card round will take place in two games and the aggregate score decides the team which advances. The remaining rounds will be played in the best-of-5 format instead of the typical best-of-7 format

Bracket

Wild-card round
The worse ranked team will play the first game at home. The aggregate score of the two games decides the winner of the round. There will be no over-time or penalty shoot-outs in the first game even if the score is tied. If the aggregate score is tied after the second game, overtime will be played in 20 minute periods until a goal is scored.

|}

Quarter-finals

Semi-finals

Bronze medal game

Finals

Lukko wins the finals 3-1.

Final rankings

See also
 2020–21 Mestis season

References

External links 
Official site 

Liiga seasons
Liiga
Liiga